The End of the War is a 1984 Yugoslav war film directed by Dragan Kresoja. The film was selected as the Yugoslav entry for the Best Foreign Language Film at the 57th Academy Awards, but was not accepted as a nominee.

Plot
At the end of World War II, a Serbian man takes his son to find and kill five members of the Croatian Ustaše militia who tortured and killed his wife and mother.

Cast
 Bata Živojinović as Bajo Lazarević
 Marko Ratić as Vukole Lazarević 
 Gorica Popović as Milka Lazarević
 Neda Arnerić as Nadica Vukelić
 Aleksandar Berček as Bora Živaljević
 Radko Polič as Kristijan
 Miroljub Lešo as Jozo
 Bogdan Diklić as Alojzije Zadro
 Josif Tatić as Hasko
 Miloš Kandić as Vijuk
 Milivoje Tomić as Old Man

See also
 List of submissions to the 57th Academy Awards for Best Foreign Language Film
 List of Yugoslav submissions for the Academy Award for Best Foreign Language Film

References

External links
 

1984 films
1980s war films
Yugoslav war films
Yugoslav World War II films
Serbian war films
1980s Serbian-language films
Serbian World War II films
Films about revenge
Films set in Yugoslavia
Films shot in Serbia
War films set in Partisan Yugoslavia